The following is a list of the presidents of Fordham University, from its establishment as St. John's College onward. From 1841 to 1846, the university was governed by the Archdiocese of New York, and was placed in the custody of the Society of Jesus thereafter.

Presidents

Archdiocese of New York

Society of Jesus

1846–1962

1963–present

Notes

References

See also
History of Fordham University

External links
Office of the President at Fordham University